The Kamini River is river in Maharashtra, India. It is one of tributaries of Bhima River. The village of Nimgaon Mhalungi is situated on the banks of Kamini river.

References

Rivers of Maharashtra
Rivers of India